"Maybe" is a song recorded by Australian group Carmada and released in October 2014 as the group's debut and lead single from their debut extedend play Realise (2014). Remixes were release in April 2015. The song was certified gold in Australia in 2015.

Video
The video was released on 28 October 2014. It was filmed along Venice Beach in Los Angeles and shows a young woman on a bike messing everybody's things up.

Track listings

Certification

References

2014 songs
2014 singles